Hongzhou may refer to:

Hongzhou (prince) (1712–1770), a Qing dynasty prince
Hongzhou school, a Chinese school of Chán Buddhism in the Tang period
Hongzhou Town, a town in Liping County, Guizhou, China
Hongzhou Township, a township in Huixian, Henan, China
Hong Prefecture, a former prefecture between the 6th and 12th centuries in modern Jiangxi, China